Alban Douglas Rendall Caroe OBE FSA FRIBA (17 April 1904 − 11 December 1991) was a British architect.

He was the son of W. D. Caroe and brother of Sir Olaf Caroe.  He married Gwendolen Mary Bragg (1907–1982), daughter of William Henry Bragg. When she died in 1982, she was writing an informal history about the Royal Institution — her book was completed by Alban. Alban and Gwendolen's son, with whom he worked, was Martin Caroe.  Their daughter, Lucy Caroe, historical geographer, married Richard Adrian, 2nd Baron Adrian. Alban Caroe was appointed an OBE in the 1987 Birthday Honours.

Notable work
 South extension to University of Wales Building, Cardiff (1954) – his father had designed the main building in 1903.

Books
 
  (1st edition, 1984)

References

External link
  (photographic portrait by Walter Stoneman)

1904 births
1991 deaths
20th-century English architects
British people of Danish descent
Fellows of the Royal Institute of British Architects
Officers of the Order of the British Empire